Cola di Pietro (active late 14th-century) was an Italian painter, active in the Marche and Umbria regions in a late Gothic style.

Almost no biographical information is available. He was likely born in  Camerino. It is not stated if he was associated with the early 15th century painter from Camerino, Arcangelo di Cola, who painted in Tuscany and the Lazio. Frescoes attributed to Cola di Pietro are found in the churches of San Francesco and Santa Maria Maddalenain Pievebovigliana.

Other works 
Frescoes in the church of Santa Maria a Vallo di Nera, Umbria 
Frescoes in Pievetorna parish in the province of Macerata, Marche

References

14th-century Italian painters
Italian male painters
People from Camerino
Gothic painters